This article summarizes the events, album releases, and album release dates in hip hop music for the year 2021.

Events

January 
 On January 1, Swae Lee and Mike Will Made It were involved in a severe car accident. They both survived.
 On January 5, Dr. Dre was admitted to the hospital after suffering a brain aneurysm. He later recovered.
 On January 7, DaBaby was arrested for gun possession in Beverly Hills, California.
 On January 12, YFN Lucci was on the run for murder in Atlanta, Georgia. He later turned himself in to the authorities. Then he was later released on $500,000 bond.
 On January 13, Chicago rapper Rico Recklezz was sentenced to prison for three years.
 On January 15, Denzel Curry and Smino found out that they were related due to an shared uncle.
 On January 19, Lil Wayne and Kodak Black were both pardoned by President Donald Trump on his last full day in office.
On January 20, 9lokkNine was arrested for multiple counts of attempted second-degree murder.
 On January 26, Georgia-based rapper 6 Dogs died from an apparent suicide.
 On January 30, Double K of People Under the Stairs died from unspecified causes.

February
 On February 1, Silentó was arrested for the murder of his cousin in DeKalb County, Georgia.
On February 2, Chief Keef was hospitalized.
 On February 12, Nicki Minaj's father Robert Maraj was killed by a hit-and-run driver.
 On February 13, Yella Beezy was arrested for a gun charge in Dallas, Texas.
 On February 18, Prince Markie Dee of The Fat Boys died.
 On February 21, a shooting occurred at Roddy Ricch and 42 Dugg's music video shoot, which left three people injured in Atlanta, Georgia. OMB Peezy was later charged in connection with the shooting with aggravated assault with a deadly weapon and possession of a firearm during the commission of a crime.
 On February 22, Kim Kardashian filed for divorce from Kanye West. She cited irreconcilable differences as the reason for their divorce.
 On February 23, Bobby Shmurda was released after serving almost 7 years in prison.

March
 On March 4, Square bought Jay-Z's streaming service Tidal.
 On March 6/7, Florida-based rapper and Kodak Black associate, Jackboy, was arrested for illegal gun possession.
On March 13, Megan Thee Stallion won the Best New Artist award at the 63rd Annual Grammy Awards. She also won Best Rap Performance and Best Rap Song with her song, "Savage (Remix)", featuring Beyoncé on the remix. Anderson .Paak won Best Melodic Rap Performance for "Lockdown" and Nas won his first Grammy with King's Disease.
On March 15, Rich the Kid was arrested for gun possession at LAX.
 On March 18, Famous Dex was arrested in Los Angeles, California, for carrying a concealed firearm.
 On March 19, Saweetie announced on Twitter she broke with up fellow rapper Quavo and accused him of cheating on her.
 On March 22, YoungBoy Never Broke Again was arrested from fleeing the police in Los Angeles, California.
On March 29, NLE Choppa was arrested for burglary, weapon charges, and drug charges in Davie, Florida. That same day, Lil Nas X gets sued by Nike, Inc. for controversy over the Satan Shoes, tied to release of his single, "Montero (Call Me by Your Name)" and the song's music video (which features similar imagery as the shoes and also caused controversy).
 On March 30, Young Dolph stated he was retiring from music.

April
 On April 2, DMX suffered a heart attack and was rushed to the hospital in critical condition.
 On April 5, Kodak Black and his security and entourage were shot at in Tallahassee, Florida, after an altercation with record producer Southside.
 On April 9, DMX's family confirmed his death exactly a week after he was rushed to the hospital. It was revealed on July 8 by the Westchester County Medical Examiner's Office that Simmons' official cause of death was a cocaine-induced heart attack.
 On April 14, Rich the Kid signed a multi-million dollar deal with Rostrum Records.
 On April 17, Black Rob, a former Bad Boy recording artist, died from kidney failure.
 On April 22, Shock G of Digital Underground died at 57.
 On April 23, Lil Mosey was charged with second-degree rape. The same day, Kehlani came out as lesbian.
On April 24/25, DMX's celebration of life and funeral took place at Barclays Center, featuring tributes, testimonies, memorials and a performance from Kanye West's Sunday Service Choir.
 On April 28, Kodak Black pled guilty in South Carolina to assault and received 18 months of probation.
 On April 30, Jack Harlow was involved in a shootout in Louisville, Kentucky. He fled the scene without any injuries.

May
 On May 2, Quando Rondo and his crew were involved in a nighttime shooting.
 On May 3, NLE Choppa and his crew were involved in a fight in Santa Monica, California.
 On May 14, Cordae announced he started a record label called Hi-Level.
 On May 15, Lil Reese was shot in a stolen vehicle in Chicago, Illinois.
 On May 16, pioneering hip hop artist Captain Rock (associated with Dr. Jeckyll & Mr. Hyde) died. The cause was not announced. That same day, Brazilian rapper MC Kevin falls to his death.
 On May 18, a Houston crip revealed that MO3 killed 2 men before his death.
On May 29, Lil Reese was arrested for assault. He was later released on a $10,000 bond.
On May 30, a music video in Huntsville, Alabama, featuring Boosie Badazz ended up in gunfire leaving 1 dead.
 On May 31, Lil Loaded committed suicide at the age of 20. That same day, an associate and protégé of DaBaby, Wisdom, was arrested for attempted murder.

June
 On June 1, Yo Gotti announced that his label Collective Music Group had signed to Interscope Records.
 On June 3, Dae Dae was announced wanted for stabbing a Dunkin' Donuts employee in December 2020.
 On June 6, Lil Durk's brother OTF Dthang was shot and killed outside a nightclub in Harvey, Illinois.
 On June 7, Snoop Dogg became the executive creative and strategic consultant of Def Jam Recordings.
 On June 8, Pooh Shiesty turned himself in after a strip club shooting, eventually getting charged for aggravated battery.
 On June 9, NLE Choppa claimed that he helped cure a girl's cancer.
On June 12, Ash Riser was found dead.
On June 12, Polo G was arrested in Miami, Florida, following an incident with the police. According to jail records, he faced five charges including battery on a police officer, threatening a public servant, resisting an officer with violence, resisting an officer without violence and criminal mischief. His brother was also arrested. This happened the same weekend that he released his third album, Hall of Fame. Later at the end of the weekend, his mother bailed him and his brother out on bond.
 On June 16, XXL released their 2021 Freshman Class, including 42 Dugg, Morray, Toosii, Blxst, Iann Dior, Coi Leray, Flo Milli, Rubi Rose, Pooh Shiesty, DDG, and Lakeyah.
 On June 21, 34 people including rappers 9lokkNine and Hotboii were arrested on charges including racketeering and conspiracy to commit racketeering.
 On June 24, the daughter of Fetty Wap died of a health condition she suffered since birth.

July
 On July 2, Lil Uzi Vert and Saint Jhn allegedly got into a confrontation after Saint Jhn was spotted by Lil Uzi Vert with his ex-girlfriend Brittany Byrd. The confrontation led to a physical altercation between the two which resulted in Lil Uzi Vert flashing a gun at the two, then holding the gun to his ex-girlfriend's stomach. It was reported that no one was harmed and everybody left the scene.
 On July 4, Meek Mill and Travis Scott allegedly got into a verbal altercation for unknown reasons, at a 4th of July party.
On July 6, Gunna was hospitalized due to possible pneumonia. That same day, XXL reported that Lil Uzi Vert allegedly hospitalized his ex-girlfriend by punching her in the face multiple times, soon after an incident when she was spotted with rapper Saint Jhn. Woods and his team did not respond to the claims made by Brittany.
 On July 7, Lil Baby was arrested on a drug charge and James Harden was stopped by the police in Paris, France after going to Paris Fashion Week alongside names like Kanye West. They were soon released.
 On July 12, Yung Mal and 5 others were arrested for murder at a deadly gas station shooting.
 On July 15, Lil Durk was targeted in a home invasion where him and his girlfriend exchanged gunfire with the suspects. Nobody was harmed and the suspects fled the scene.
 On July 16, SpotemGottem was arrested for aggravated assault with a firearm. That same day, Biz Markie died due to complications with diabetes.
 On July 17, Eli Fross was arrested for attempted murder. 
 On July 18, Sheff G was arrested for gun possession.
 On July 22, Fredo Bang was reportedly arrested in Miami, Florida, along with his friend and fellow rapper, Lit Yoshi, for opening fire on a vehicle with some of YoungBoy Never Broke Again's crew, and reportedly striking a man in the process.
 On July 23, Florida rapper Money Mitch reportedly died by suicide, following a shootout with police officers in Palm Beach County, Florida. He was affiliated with fellow rappers like Lil Baby. On that same day, Lil Uzi Vert confirmed that he bought a planet (WASP-127B), according to Grimes, wife of Elon Musk.
 On July 25, DaBaby faced backlash for rant that was described as homophobic during his performance at Rolling Loud in Miami, Florida. He also responded to criticism in a response video which was also controversial. He received criticism from music icons like Madonna and Elton John as well as Dua Lipa, who he collaborated with on the international hit single, "Levitating". His version of the song was removed from places like Apple Music playlists and certain radio stations due to his comments; being replaced with a version of the song with Dua Lipa only. DaBaby was dropped from a variety of festivals during this time including iHeartRadio Music Festival and Lollapalooza.
 On July 30, Gonzoe, who was friends with Tupac Shakur and Ice Cube and a member of rap group Kausion, was shot and killed in a shooting at Seattle, Washington.
 On July 31, Edai was shot and killed in Chicago, Illinois.

August
 On August 4, T.I. was arrested and held in Amsterdam, Netherlands, due to the bicycle that he was riding with colliding with a police vehicle and knocking off its wing mirror.
 On August 9, producer Chucky Thompson died at the age of 53 due to COVID-19 complications. He worked for artists such as The Notorious B.I.G., Nas and Sean Combs & Bad Boy Records.
On August 15, a close friend to Polo G, BMoney1300, was shot and killed in Chicago, Illinois.
 On August 20, Kendrick Lamar announced that his next album would be his final release with Top Dawg Entertainment.
 On August 30, it was announced that SpotemGottem was wanted in connection to a Dallas, Texas, murder.

September
On September 7, Trippie Redd's tour bus was shot at, following a concert in Baltimore, Maryland.
On September 16, SpotemGottem was shot and wounded in Miami, Florida. He is said to be stable and recovering.
  On September 24, 21 Savage turned himself in after his February 2019 ICE arrest. That same day, YoungBoy Never Broke Again announced he will be featured in an upcoming animated series Crook County created by animator LookImHD which will be released on WorldStarHipHop. The announcement came shortly after the release of his third studio album Sincerely, Kentrell.
 On September 29, it was announced Dr. Dre, Eminem, Mary J. Blige, Kendrick Lamar and Snoop Dogg would perform at next year's Super Bowl LVI Halftime Show.

October
On October 7, Kodak Black tweeted a series of suicidal comments, and disabled all his social media accounts.
 On October 12, Tyga was arrested on felony domestic violence charges, after an altercation with his ex-girlfriend, Camaryn Swanson.
 On October 13, OTF Boona was arrested in connection with a shooting in a Atlanta, Georgia.
 On October 14, it was reported that R&B singer Emani22, a well-known collaborator of Trippie Redd, died in a car accident at the age of 22 (She died on October 11). The same day, producer D. Hill (known for producing Future's best performing hit as lead artist, "Life Is Good", featuring Drake) also died at the age of 25. The cause of his cause of his death is unknown.
 On October 23, Boosie Badazz told Lil Nas X to kill himself in a homophobic rant on social media.
 On October 26, YoungBoy Never Broke Again was released from jail in Louisiana.
 On October 27, Benny the Butcher was hospitalized for an asthma-related issue.
On October 29, Fetty Wap was arrested at the New York Rolling Loud festival, on drug-related charges. He was released on a $500,000 bond on November 5, 2021.

November
 On November 4, Kanye West said the worst thing he ever did was sign Big Sean to his record label.
 On November 5, a crowd crush took place at Travis Scott's Astroworld Festival, in which eight people died in a stampede from compression in the audience, which caused people to panic and pass out. Additionally, 25 people were hospitalized, and more than 300 people were treated for injuries. On November 10 and 14, two more people died from injuries, bringing the death toll to ten.
 On November 12, Yella Beezy was arrested for sexual assault, abandoned endangered child and weapon charges in Dallas, Texas. The same day, DaBaby called police on ex-girlfriend and mother to his child DaniLeigh.
 On November 16, Drake and Kanye West ended their three-year feud with the help of Larry Hoover and J. Prince.
 On November 17, Young Dolph was fatally shot in Memphis, Tennessee.
 On November 28, Virgil Abloh passed away from cancer. Abloh was in charge of Louis Vuitton's menswear section and started fashion brand Off-White. He was involved in hip hop culture and notably designed several hip-hop adjacent album covers, including Watch the Throne, 808s & Heartbreak, Luv Is Rage 2, and Pray for Paris.
On November 30, Rihanna was declared a national hero by the nation of Barbados. After appearing in Barbados to celebrate this award, rumors arose that Rihanna was pregnant with A$AP Rocky's child. On the same day, a Louis Vuitton show was held in Miami, as a tribute to Virgil Abloh.

December
On December 1, 50 Cent and French Montana ended their beef. That same day, Chicago rapper Montana of 300 tweeted he is fighting for his life after contracting COVID-19 and pneumonia.
 On December 8, rapper and YG associate, Slim 400, was fatally shot.
 On December 12, Travis Scott was removed from the 2022 Coachella lineup due to his Astroworld Festival controversy.
 On December 14, Flavor Flav was nearly crushed by a boulder.
 On December 16, Florida rapper 9lokkNine was sentenced to over 7 years in prison for attempted murder and racketeering charges.
 On December 17, Lil Nas X was tested positive for COVID-19.
 On December 18, Kangol Kid passed away at the age of 55, he died from his battle with colon cancer. The same day, Drakeo the Ruler was stabbed at a concert and died the next day after being in critical condition.
 On December 21, Westside Gunn was hospitalized after an emergency health scare.
 On December 23, Kay Flock was arrested on murder charges after being accused of fatally shooting 24-year-old Oscar Hernandez.

Released albums

January

February

March

April

May

June

July

August

September

October

November

December

Highest-charting songs

Highest first-week consumption

All critically reviewed albums ranked

Metacritic

See also
 Previous article: 2020 in hip hop music
 Next article: 2022 in hip hop music

References

Hip hop music by year
hip hop